Cuthbert Ormond Simpkins (January 13, 1925 – December 4, 2019) was a dentist, civil rights campaigner, and state legislator in Louisiana. He left the state under threat of violence before returning.

He was born in Mansfield, Louisiana to Oscar Simpkins. He studied at Wiley College and graduated from Tennessee State University with an undergraduate degree. He received a Doctorate of Dental Surgery from Meharry Medical College School of Dentistry in Nashville, Tennessee.

He served in the U.S. Air Force. He was a founding member of the Southern Christian Leadership Conference. He lived in Shreveport. His home and office were firebombed.

He lived in New York for 26 years before returning to Shreveport. A Democrat, he served in the Louisiana House of Representatives from 1992 to 1996.

He was married to Elaine nee Shoemaker Simpkins. There were no children from this marriage. Dr. Simpkins had a total of children.

Mansfield's post office was renamed for him.

References

1925 births
2019 deaths
People from Mansfield, Louisiana
Democratic Party members of the Louisiana House of Representatives
20th-century American politicians
United States Air Force officers
Wiley College alumni
Tennessee State University alumni
Meharry Medical College alumni
African-American state legislators in Louisiana
American dentists